Grandcourt is the name of the following communes in France:

 Grandcourt, Seine-Maritime, in the Seine-Maritime department
 Grandcourt, Somme, in the Somme department